Eastern Acoustic Works (EAW) is an American manufacturer of mainly professional audio reinforcement tools, such as loudspeaker systems and processors. 
From 1978-1988 it was located at 59 Fountain Street in Framingham, Massachusetts, and subsequently One Main Street in Whitinsville, Massachusetts.

Corporate history 
Eastern Acoustic Works was co-founded in 1978 by partners Kenneth Berger and Kenton Forsythe, who had previously worked together at Forsythe Audio.

EAW's first single enclosure system was the CS-3 designed for Carlo Sound in Nashville, Tennessee. It combined a B-215 dual 15-in low-frequency horn, a MR102 12-in mid-frequency horn and a Community BRH90 high frequency horn into one gigantic box, and was the first commercially available horn-loaded single enclosure box system.

In 1985 EAW became famous by developing the KF850 loudspeaker system. For many years this system was the standard among loudspeakers used for professional touring shows. With this system EAW gained much of its credibility in the professional audio industry. Carlo Sound and Sun Sound were among the first regional sound rental companies to receive the KF850's.

EAW also became well known for creating custom loudspeaker designs for specific projects and applications. Technologies developed for these designs have led to the development of many of EAW's standard products, which are mainly used in professional and commercial sound reinforcement applications, such as concert venues, music and dance clubs, theaters, stadiums, theme parks, and houses of worship.

In 2000 EAW was purchased by Mackie Designs, Inc., now called LOUD Audio, LLC.

In 2018, EAW was purchased by RCF audio, to be run as a separate entity.

Current People
TJ Smith, President
James Newhouse, VP of Global Sales

References

External links
EAW website

Loudspeaker manufacturers
Manufacturers of professional audio equipment
Companies based in Massachusetts
Audio equipment manufacturers of the United States
LOUD Audio
2000 mergers and acquisitions
2018 mergers and acquisitions